Tambaram is a southern suburb of Chennai, India. Located in the Chengalpattu district of Tamil Nadu, it is governed by Tambaram City Municipal Corporation and is a part of the Chennai Metropolitan Area.

Etymology 
Tambaram is an ancient town referred to as Taamapuram in an inscription of the 13th century. The word was inscribed on the walls around the sanctum sanctorum at Marundeeswarar temple in Tirukachur village, near Chengalpattu.

History
The earliest mention of Tambaram dates back to the 13th century when the word 'Taamapuram' was inscribed on the walls around the sanctum sanctorum at Marundeeswarar temple in Tirukachur village, near Chengalpattu.

Old Stone Age 
The oldest locality in Tambaram City is Pallavapuram which is considered one of the oldest inhabited places in South Asia.  Pallavapuram consists of the present-day neighbourhood of Chromepet and Pallavaram.

On May 13, 1863, Robert Bruce Foote, a British geologist with the Geological Survey of India (GSI), discovered a hand axe belonging to the Lower Palaeolithic Age at Pallavaram (Pallavapuram). Since then, several Stone Age artefacts have been discovered. Most of these artefacts are currently lodged in the Egmore museum.

Early Medieval Period

Pallava Dynasty 
The oldest locality in the city, Pallavapuram, existed during the reign of Pallava king Mahendravarman I (that is, 600–630 CE). The Pallavas have left titles in early Pallava script at the cave temple in Pallavaram neighbourhood which dates back to 600 CE. The remains of a cave shrine constructed by the Pallava ruler have been found at Asthana-E-Moula Ali Dargah.

Chola Dynasty 
During the reign of Later Cholas, from ninth to twelfth century CE, the region was called Churathur Nadu. Churathur Nadu was named after Thiruchuram, the present-day Trisulam. The Churathur Nadu extended from Tambaram in the south to Adambakkam and Alandur in the north. The region included the city neighborhood⁠— Pammal, Pallavaram, and Thiruneermalai.

Colonial Period 
During the Carnatic wars in the late 17th century, Tambaram was an entrenchment camp for the British East India Company. During the 17th century, Pallavaram remained dependent upon the Portuguese colony of San Thome. Later, the British established a cantonment at Pallavaram, supplementary to the one at St. Thomas Mount.

A wireless station was established in the early years of the 20th century. The Madras Aerodrome was opened at Pallavaram in 1929.

Post-Independence 
Before 1964, Tambaram was a small panchayat. In 1964, it was constituted as a Grade III Municipality comprising the Village Panchayats of Pulikoradu, Kadapperi, Tambaram, Irumbliyur, and Selaiyur.

Due to rapid development and growth of the town commercially and residentially, the Municipality was classified as a 'Selection Grade Municipality'. The revenue villages under this municipality are Pulikoradu, Kadapperi, Tambaram, Irumbliyur, and Selaiyur. The number of households is 26,333, the number of notified slums is 17 and the number of unnotified slums is 7. The Tambaram range comprises forest lands in Nanmangalam, Madurapakkam, Tambaram, Pulikoradu, Kumili, Vandalur, Onnamancherry, Erumaiyur, Vattampakkam and Vadakupattu.

In 2009, Tambaram taluk was trifurcated into Tambaram, Sholinganallur and Alandur taluks. Clubbing all the three taluks, a new revenue division with Tambaram as headquarters was formed.

Creation of the Municipal Corporation 
The increasing population and rapid urbanisation increased the need for town planning, improved administration structure and human resource planning. These demands drove the creation of Tambaram City Municipal Corporation. The announcement to establish the Tambaram City Municipal Corporation was made by Minister for Municipal Administration K. N. Nehru in the state Assembly, on August 24, 2021 by merging five municipalities, five town panchayats and fifteen village panchayats.

Following a supreme court ruling to conduct rural local body elections by October 2021, the village panchayats elections for Pozhichalur, Cowl Bazaar, Tirusulam, Moovarasampattu, Kovilambakkam, Nanmangalam, Medavakkam, Vengaivasal, Perumbakkam, Sithalapakkam, Ottiyambakkam, Madurambakkam, Agaramthen, Thiruvancheri, Mudichur of the St.Thomas Mount panchayat union were held. As a result, the 15 village panchayats were excluded from the Government order issued by the State Government of Tamil Nadu on September 11, 2021.

The five municipalities— Anakaputhur, Pallavaram, Pammal, Sembakkam and Tambaram, and five town panchayats— Chitlapakkam, Madambakkam, Perungaluthur, Peerkangaranai and Tiruneermalai, were merged to form the Tambaram City Municipal Corporation. After the tenure of existing village panchayats ends in 2026, the proposed village panchayats may get annexed into corporation limits, and may accordingly be converted into urban wards.

Geography

Climate 
Tambaram features a tropical wet and dry climate. Tambaram lies on the thermal equator and is also coastal, which prevents extreme variation in seasonal temperature. For most of the year, the weather is hot and humid.

The city gets most of its seasonal rainfall from the north-east monsoon winds, from mid-September to mid-December. Cyclones in the Bay of Bengal sometimes hit the city. The most prevailing winds in Tambaram is the Southwesterly between the end of May to end of September and the Northeasterly during the rest of the year.

Water Bodies 
Some of the notable lakes in the city are Chitlapakkam Lake, Pallavaram Lake (locally known as Periya eri), Thiruneermalai Lake, Thirupananthal Lake, Peerkankaranai Lake, and Perungalathur Lake.

Governance 
 
Tambaram City is governed by the Tambaram City Municipal Corporation, which was established on November 3, 2021.

Administration Divisions 

When Tambaram City Municipal Corporation was established, it consisted of 70 wards under 5 zones.

Executive Branch 

The executive authority in Tambaram City Municipal Corporation is vested in Corporation Commissioner. The current Corporation Commissioner is M. Elangovan, who has held the position since November 3, 2021.

Legislative Branch 

The legislative branch of Tambaram City Municipal Corporation consists of a council of elected councillors from each ward. The Legislative body is presided over by the Mayor who is indirectly elected by the councillors. The Mayor is the head of the municipal corporation, but the role is largely ceremonial as executive powers are vested in the Corporation Commissioner. The office of the Mayor combines a functional role of chairing the Corporation meeting as well as a ceremonial role associated with being the First Citizen of the city. Deputy Mayor is appointed by the Mayor for a five-year term.

At the present, the corporation is governed by Secular Progressive Alliance which collectively holds 53 out of 70 seats in the council. The opposition is led by All India Anna Dravida Munnetra Kazhagam which holds 9 seats in the council. The current Mayor is Vasanthakumari Kamalakannan, who assumed the position on 4 March 2022. The current Deputy Mayor is G Kamaraj, who assumed the position on 4 March 2022.

Law and order 
In September 2021, the government revealed its plans of reforming the Greater Chennai City Police and setting up two new commissionerates in Tambaram and Avadi. Subsequently, Additional Director Generals of Police (ADGPs) M. Ravi was deputed as special officers to form the Commissionerates. The new Police Commissionerates in Tambaram was formally inaugurated by the Chief Minister M. K. Stalin on 1 January 2022.

The Tambaram police commissionerate will function with two police districts⁠— Tambaram and Pallikaranai, comprising 20 police stations. For ease of administration, Somangalam and Manimangalam police stations from Kancheepuram district along with Otteri, Guduvanchery, Maraimalai Nagar, Thalambur and Kelambakkam police stations from Chengalpattu district have been attached to the Tambaram Police Commissionerate.

Urban Planning 
The Chennai Metropolitan Development Authority (CMDA) is the nodal agency responsible for planning and development of the city. It is responsible for all the three Municipal Corporation in the Chennai Metropolitan Area— Tambaram City Municipal Corporation, Avadi Municipal Corporation and Greater Chennai Corporation.

Demographics 
The 2021 population estimates project the population of Tambaram at 960,887.

Economy 
When established, Tambaram City Municipal Corporation was estimated to earn  3 billion in revenue approximately through local bodies connected to it.

Madras Export Processing Zone 

It is one of the seven export processing zones in the country set up by the central government. It was established in 1984 to promote foreign direct investment, enhance foreign exchange earnings, and create greater employment opportunities in the region.

The zone is under the administrative control of the Ministry of Commerce and Industries and caters to the needs of units within the SEZ, in addition to monitoring the functions of 100-percent export-oriented units (EOUs) located in Tamil Nadu, Pondicherry, and Andaman & Nicobar Islands. The zone is headed by a development commissioner.

Spread over an area of 265 acres (109 hectares), MEPZ SEZ is a multi-product zone housing 117 functional units. In addition, another 27 units are under various stages of implementation. The zone employs over 26,000 people. In the manufacturing front, there are 110 SME units in the zone. MEPZ's manufacturing sector employs nearly 20,000 people. IT companies housed in the zone include Cognizant Technology Solutions, Computer Sciences Corporation, CSS and HTC Global Services among others. About 50 container trucks arrive at and leave the zone every day.

Culture

Architecture

Dravidian

Medieval Cholas

Dhenupureeswarar Temple 

Dhenupureeswarar Temple is also known as Dhenupurisvara, and Thiripureeswarar temple. These names are colloquial name of Hindu deity Shiva. The temple is located in Madambakkam neighbourhood of the city and it was built during the reign of Parantaka Chola II (r. 962–980 CE).

The garbhagriha, which is Sanskrit equivalent of sanctum sanctorum, houses the primary deity Dhenupureeswara in linga form. The main garbhagriha is apsidal in shape and this is a characteristic feature of Shiva Temples built during Chola Period. This type of garbhagriha are known as gajaprishta vimana, where "gajaprishta" literally means "back of an elephant" in Samskrit. This type of vimana here is a separate south-facing garbhagriha for the Dhenupureeswarar's Consort Goddess Dhenukambal adjacent to the main garbhagriha.

The epigraphs in the temple date to the reign of Kulottunga Chola III and Rajaraja Chola III of Chola Dynasty; Jatavarman Sundara Pandyan I of Pandya Dyanasty; Kampana Udaiyar and Devaraya II of Sangama dynasty and Sadasiva Raya of Tuluva dynasty. These epigraphs and expansions shows the continued patronage of the temple under various dyanastic rule.

The temple is one of the 163 megalithic sites in the state of Tamil Nadu. The temple has been declared a monument of national importance under the Ancient Monuments and Archaeological Sites and Remains (amendment and validation) 2010 Act. The temple has been conserved and restored by Archaeological Survey of India.

Infrastructure

Transportation

Rail 
The inter-state railway service is provided by Southern Railway of Indian Railways. The inter-city railway service is provided by Chennai Suburban Railway operated by Indian Railways.

Inter-state 

The Tambaram Railway Station is one of the four main terminals located in the Chennai Metropolitan Area. The other three terminals are Chennai Central, Chennai Egmore, Chennai Beach. Similar to Chennai Egmore Station, Tambaram Railway Station provides access to destinations primarily within Tamil Nadu; however, it also handles a few interstate trains.

Inter-city

Chennai Suburban Railway 

The Chennai Suburban Railway is a commuter rail system in the city of Chennai, Tamil Nadu, India, operated by the Indian Railways. Every day, 160 train services are operated between Chennai Beach and Tambaram, 70 between Tambaram and Chengalpet and 16 between Tambaram and Kancheepuram.

The city is served by the South Line of Chennai Suburban Railway which runs between Chennai Beach to Chengalpattu. There are five stops within the City— Pallavaram, Chromepet, Tambaram Sanatorium, Tambaram, and Perungalathur. The South Line connects Tambaram with seven major interchange stations out of the eight in Chennai Suburban Railway Network.

The longest circular train in India runs through Tambaram, connecting the city with Chennai Beach, Egmore, Chengalpattu, Kanchipuram, Takkolam, Arakkonam Junction, Tiruvallur, Avadi, Ambattur, Vyasarpadi Jeeva, Washermanpet and Royapuram.

Notable places 

 Embassy splendid IT Park, Pallavaram.
 Madras Institute of Technology, Chromepet, Pallavapuram. Former President A.P.J. Abdul Kalam was a student of this institute.
 Madras Christian College, East Tambaram.
 Tambaram Air Force Station, Selaiyur.
 Ranganatha Temple, Thiruneermalai, one among the 108 Divya desams.
 Rettai Pillayar Koil, Pammal.
 National Institute of Siddha, Kadapperi, Tambaram.
 Government Hospital of Thoracic Medicine, Tambaram Sanatorium, Chitlapakkam.
 Government Hospital, Chromepet, Pallavapuram.
 Airport Authority of India Signal Office, Iyyappa Nagar, Pammal.
 Dhenupureeswarar Temple, Madambakkam.
 Catholic Shrine of Our Lady of Fatima, East Tambaram.
 Sankara Eye Hospital, Pammal.
 Sri Sankara Vidyalaya Matriculation Higher Secondary School, Pammal.
 PKS Fishmarket, Nagalkeni, Pammal.
 Holy Family Convent Matriculation Higher Secondary School, Keelkattalai, Pallavapuram.
 Vels Institute of Science, Technology & Advanced Studies, Pallavaram, Pallavapuram.
 Gateway office IT park, New Perungalathur.
 Anakaputhur Jute Weavers Association, Anakaputhur is an internationally renowned place for natural fibre fabrics.
 Velco Cinemas, Anakaputhur.
 Ganesh Cinemas Hall, Anakaputhur.
 Varadharaja Theatres, Chitlapakkam.
 Vettri Theatres, Chromepet, Pallavapuram.
 National Theatre, Tambaram.
 Dr. Rela Institute & Medical Centre, Chromepet, Pallavapuram.
 Royal Balaji Hospital, Chromepet, Pallavapuram.
 Sembakkam EB children's Park, Sembakkam.
 Sooriyamman Temple Pond and Park, Pammal.
 Alavattamman Kovil Park, Kamarajapuram, Sembakkam.

Gallery

See also
Tambaram City Municipal Corporation
Tambaram Police Commissionerate
Chennai metropolitan area
List of municipal corporations in Tamil Nadu

References

Neighbourhoods in Chennai
Suburbs of Chennai
Geography of Chennai
Cities and towns in Chengalpattu district